The 2009–10 Australian Women's Twenty20 Cup was the first formal season of the Australian Women's Twenty20 Cup, which was the premier domestic women's Twenty20 cricket competition in Australia prior to the inception of the Women's Big Bash League in 2015. The tournament started on 23 October 2009 and finished on 23 January 2010. Victorian Spirit won the tournament after finishing second in the group stage and beating New South Wales Breakers in the final.

Ladder

Fixtures

Final

Statistics

Highest totals

Most runs

Most wickets

References

External links
 Series home at ESPNcricinfo

 
Australian Women's Twenty20 Cup seasons
 
Australian Women's Twenty20 Cup